Urdu Academy is the term used for various state academies, institutes & agencies set up by the respective governments for the promoting, preserving  and developing Urdu language and the traditions & culture associated it.

India
Most of these academies were constituted in 1970s, later in 1996 National Council for Promotion of Urdu Language was constituted as national level nodal agency for these agencies.

Following is the list of Urdu academies and organizations working for the promotion of the Urdu language and literature in India,

See also
 List of Islamic universities and colleges in India

References

Urdu in India
Linguistic research institutes in India
Urdu Academies in India